Chink is an English-language ethnic slur usually referring to a person of Chinese descent.

Chink may also refer to:


People
 Chink (nickname), various people
 Chink Martin (1886–1981), stage name of American jazz tuba player Martin Abraham
 Chink Santana (born 1972), stage name of American R&B musician and producer Andre Parker

Other uses
 Chink (Isle of Wight), a scenic rock cleft on Isle of Wight
 A common name for the plant Bourreria baccata
 A colloquial term for the common pheasant in the United States
 "Chink", an episode of the 2010 British Television drama Married Single Other
 Chinks, a half-length type of chaps, leather coverings for the legs

See also

Chik (disambiguation)
 Chink in one's armor, a term for a vulnerability
 Chink-a-chink, a magic coin trick
 Chinka (disambiguation)
 Chinking, the process of filling gaps during construction of a log cabin
 Chinky, a Chinese take-away in parts of northern England